USS Hoqua (SP-142) was an armed yacht that served in the United States Navy as a patrol vessel from 1917 to 1919.
 
Hoqua was built as a civilian yacht in 1914 by Charles Seabury at Morris Heights in the Bronx, New York. The U.S. Navy acquired her from her owner, Robert M. Curtis of Chicago, Illinois, in June 1917 for use as a patrol vessel during World War I. She was commissioned at Brooklyn, New York, on 27 July 1917 as USS Hoqua (SP-142).

Hoqua was assigned to the 3rd Naval District, and performed general harbor duties at Brooklyn until 27 March 1918, when she arrived at New Haven, Connecticut, for duty. She served there as an inshore patrol vessel and as an escort for submarines in and around New Haven harbor for the remainder of the war.

The Navy returned Hoqua to her owner on 6 February 1919.

References

Department of the Navy Naval Historical Center Online Library of Selected Images: Civilian Ships: Motor Yacht Hoqua (1914); Later USS Hoqua (SP-142), 1917-1919
NavSource Online: Section Patrol Craft Photo Archive: Hoqua (SP 142)

Patrol vessels of the United States Navy
World War I patrol vessels of the United States
Ships built in Morris Heights, Bronx
Individual yachts
1914 ships